Subhankar Banerjee (20 August 1966 – 25 August 2021) was an Indian musician and tabla player of the Farukhabad tradition.

Biography
He studied initially with Manik Das of the Benares tradition before learning with Swapan Siva of the Farukhabad tradition, which he is more associated with.

He regularly supported Amjad Ali Khan, Rashid Khan, Birju Maharaj, Hariprasad Chaurasia, and Shivkumar Sharma on stage. He was also a tabla soloist.

Banerjee contracted COVID-19 in June 2021. He died a few months later in August, five days after his 55th birthday.

See also
Yogesh Samsi
Kumar Bose
Swapan Chaudhuri
Anindo Chatterjee
Zakir Hussain

References

External links

 Official site

1966 births
2021 deaths
Musicians from Kolkata
Indian drummers
Hindustani instrumentalists
Tabla players
Indian male classical musicians
Deaths from the COVID-19 pandemic in India